Humanitix is a not-for-profit organisation, notable for operating an event ticketing platform to raise funds for education projects. Humanitix directs 100% of profits from booking fees to a range of education programs and operates in the US, UK, Canada, Australia and New Zealand.

Humanitix is the subject of research into ethical businesses run by the University of New South Wales Business School in Sydney, Australia.

It is a Public Benevolent Institution, registered with the Australian Charities and Not-for-profits Commission since 2 May 2017. Humanitix operates in Australia and New Zealand.

As well as income from ticket booking fees, Humanitix has received AUD$1.2million grant from the Atlassian Foundation. In 2018, Humanitix won a AUD$1 million grant from Google.org by coming first place in the Google Impact Challenge. In New Zealand, the organisation has also received support from the NEXT Foundation. In 2018 the organisation was also named one of Westpac's Top 20 Businesses of Tomorrow and Social Entrepreneurs Of The Year in the Third Sector Awards.

Humanitix was founded by former hedge fund manager Joshua Ross, and former management consultant Adam McCurdie.

References 

Non-profit organisations based in Australia